Guido Papini  (1 August 1847 – 3 October 1912) was an Italian violinist, composer and teacher. During his career he lived in London and Dublin.

Life
Papini was born in Camaiore in 1847. He studied with Ferdinando Giorgetti in Florence, and gave his first concert there in 1860, playing Louis Spohr's third violin concerto.

From 1874 he lived in London; he took part in the Musical Union concerts of John Ella, playing in string quartets. He was soloist at concerts of the Philharmonic Society in 1875, 1877 and 1878. In 1876 he appeared in Paris with an orchestra directed by Jules Pasdeloup.

A concert of the Philharmonic Society in 1875 was reviewed:

In 1893 he became violin professor at the Royal Irish Academy of Music in Dublin. He returned to London in 1896, in poor health; he composed and gave private tuition. He was for many years president of the College of Violinists in London, and was one of its examiners.

Papini died in London in 1912.

Compositions
Papini's published works include:
 A violin concerto (Milan, 1876) and two cello concertos (Milan, 1874 and London, 1877)
 Transcriptions for violin and piano
 Violin tutors including Il Metodo per violino, reissued as Le Mécanisme du jeune violoniste Op.57 (London, 1883)
 L'Argentine, Op.88
 6 Characteristic Pieces, Op.100
 Adieux à Naples, Op.27
 8 morceaux faciles, Op.57
 3 Pieces, Op.102
 2 Pieces, Op.205
 Theme and Variations, Op.37

References

External links
 

1847 births
1912 deaths
Musicians from the Province of Lucca
19th-century classical composers
19th-century classical violinists
Italian classical violinists
Italian classical composers
19th-century Italian composers
Italian emigrants to the United Kingdom